Perry Will is an American politician and retired wildlife officer from the state of Colorado. He is a Republican member of the Colorado Senate. He represents District 5, which includes  Pitkin, Gunnison, and Hinsdale counties and portions of Eagle, Garfield, Montrose, and Delta counties.

Previously, Will represented the 57th district of the Colorado House of Representatives, based in the northwestern corner of the state, from 2019 to early 2023.

Will was appointed to the State House following incumbent Bob Rankin's appointment to the Colorado Senate. A vacancy committee met and chose Will from a field of four candidates, including Rankin's wife Joyce. Prior to his appointment to the legislature, Will had worked for Colorado Parks and Wildlife for 43 years.

In the 2022 Colorado House of Representatives election, Will was defeated by Democrat Elizabeth Velasco.

Following State Senator Bob Rankin's announced resignation on January 10, 2023, a vacancy committee selected Will to fill Rankin's seat. Will represents the newly-reapportioned Senate District 5.

References

External links
Legislative website
Campaign website

Living people
Republican Party Colorado state senators
People from Garfield County, Colorado
Republican Party members of the Colorado House of Representatives
21st-century American politicians
Year of birth missing (living people)